The 2012–13 FC Twente season was spent in the Eredivisie.

Squad

 (on loan from 1899 Hoffenheim)

Out on loan

UEFA List B

Transfers

Summer

In:

Out:

Winter

In:

Out:

Competitions

Eredivisie

Results summary

Results by round

Matches

League table

European competition

KNVB Beker

UEFA Europa League

Qualifying Phase

Group stage

Squad statistics

Appearances and goals

|-
|colspan="14"|Players away from Twente on loan:

|-
|colspan="14"|Players who appeared for Twente no longer at the club:

|}

Goal scorers

Disciplinary record

References

FC Twente seasons
Twente
Twente